Saulo may refer to the following people:
Given name
Saulo Araújo Fontes (born 1989), Brazilian football goalkeeper
Saulo Batista de Andrade Cordeiro (born 1979), Brazilian football midfielder
Saulo Benavente (1916–1982), Argentine painter
Saulo Cavalari (born 1989), Brazilian kickboxer
Saulos Chilima, Malawian economist and politician
Saulo Decarli (born 1992), Swiss football defender
Saulo Estevao da Costa Pimenta (born 1974), Brazilian football player
Saulo Fernandes (born 1977), Brazilian singer
Saulo Ferreira Silva (born 1995), Brazilian football goalkeeper
Saulo Haarla (1930–1971), Finnish actor and theatre manager
Saülo Mercader (born 1944), Spanish artist
Saulo Ribeiro (born 1974), Brazilian Jiu-Jitsu practitioner
Saulo Rodrigues dos Santos (born 1982), Brazilian footballer
Saulo Roston (born 1989), Brazilian pop singer and songwriter
Saulo Squarsone Rodrigues dos Santos (born 1985), Brazilian football goalkeeper 
Saulo Torón Navarro (1885–1974), Spanish poet

Surname
Celeste Saulo (born 1964), meteorologist from Argentine
Manasa Saulo (born 1989), Fiji rugby union footballer
Ramon Sauló (born 1954), Spanish singer and graphic designer 
Vui Florence Saulo, businesswoman and politician from American Samoa